Johan Oskar Löfkvist (born 27 September 1980) is a Swedish actor.

Filmography
Beck – Lockpojken (1997)
Nils Karlsson Pyssling (1990)

References

External links

1980 births
Swedish male film actors
Living people
Place of birth missing (living people)
20th-century Swedish male actors